Planet Fun may refer to:
 Planet Fun, a traveling fun fair at Carrickfergus Castle, Northern Ireland that had a malfunctioning ride, see Incidents at European amusement parks
 Planet Fun, a television channel in Pakistan, run by Mimyuni Media Entertainment 
 Planet Fun, a distributor in New Zealand for the Thunderbirds Are Go merchandise
 Planet Fun, a former moniker for KXBS
 "Planet Fun" , a song from the episode "Fly Us to the Moon" on the show Wow! Wow! Wubbzy!

See also 
 Planet FunFun, a former indoor amusement park located in Kerava, Finland
 Planet Funk, Italian electronic band